In molecular biology, glycoside hydrolase family 20 is a family of glycoside hydrolases.

Glycoside hydrolases  are a widespread group of enzymes that hydrolyse the glycosidic bond between two or more carbohydrates, or between a carbohydrate and a non-carbohydrate moiety. A classification system for glycoside hydrolases, based on sequence similarity, has led to the definition of >100 different families. This classification is available on the CAZy web site, and also discussed at CAZypedia, an online encyclopedia of carbohydrate active enzymes.

Glycoside hydrolase family 20 CAZY GH_20 comprises enzymes with several known activities; beta-hexosaminidase; lacto-N-biosidase. Carbonyl oxygen of the C-2 acetamido group of the substrate acts as the catalytic nucleophile/base in this family of enzymes.

In the brain and other tissues, beta-hexosaminidase A degrades GM2 gangliosides; specifically, the enzyme hydrolyses terminal non-reducing N-acetyl-D-hexosamine residues in N-acetyl-beta-D-hexosaminides. There are 3 forms of beta-hexosaminidase: hexosaminidase A is a trimer, with one alpha, one beta-A and one beta-B chain; hexosaminidase B is a tetramer of two beta-A and two beta-B chains; and hexosaminidase S is a homodimer of alpha chains. The two beta chains are derived from the cleavage of a precursor. Mutations in the beta-chain lead to Sandhoff disease, a lysosomal storage disorder characterised by accumulation of GM2 ganglioside.

References 

EC 3.2.1
GH family
Protein families